Wattay International Airport  is one of the few international airports in Laos and the country's main international gateway, serving the capital Vientiane, located 3 km (2 mi) outside of the city centre. A larger domestic terminal was constructed in 2018 and connected to the international terminal.  There is a Lao Air Force installation at one end of the airport.

The airport is in Sikhodtabong District in Vientiane. The head offices of the Department of Civil Aviation and Lao Air are on the airport property. Lao Airlines is revising flying to Yangon. The largest airplane that is flown to Vientiane is the Airbus A330. This is flown by Thai Airways International. The largest airplane that has ever visited this airport is the Boeing 747-400, carrying Park Geun-hye – then-president of South Korea – for the 2016 ASEAN summit.

Airlines and destinations

Facilities

 Banks
 Bars
 Restaurants
 Duty-free shop
 Post office
 Shops
 Internet café

The airport has a bonded warehouse building for air cargo passing through the airport. The facility is operated by Lao-Japan Airport Terminal Building Service Co. Ltd.

Ground transportation

Access to airport by shuttle bus, taxi, car, tuk-tuk and walking. A taxi rank is located outside the main arrival hall. The shuttle bus stop is located outside the international terminal.

References

External links

 Laos Travel Information Portal
 Vientiane Airport Guide

Airports in Laos
Buildings and structures in Vientiane